Jaane Bhi Do Yaaro is a 1983 Indian Hindi-language satirical black comedy film directed by Kundan Shah and produced by NFDC. It is a dark satire on the rampant corruption in Indian politics, bureaucracy, news media and business, and stars an ensemble cast including Naseeruddin Shah, Ravi Baswani, Om Puri, Pankaj Kapur, Satish Shah, Satish Kaushik, Bhakti Barve and Neena Gupta.

Kundan Shah won the 1984 Indira Gandhi Award for Best Debut Film of a Director for his work. The film was part of the NFDC Retrospective at India International Film Festival in 2006.

Plot

 
Professional photographers Vinod Chopra and Sudhir Mishra open a photo studio in the prestigious Haji Ali area in Bombay, and hope to make enough money to keep it running. After a disastrous start, they are given some work by the editor of "Khabardar", a publication that exposes the scandalous lives of the rich and the famous. They accept it and start working with the editor, Shobha Sen, on a story exposing the dealings between an unscrupulous builder, Tarneja, and corrupt Municipal Commissioner D'Mello. During their investigation, they find out that another builder Ahuja who is Tarneja's business rival is also involved in this dealing to get a contract for building 4 flyovers from D'Mello. Next, the duo are assigned to secretly enter Tarneja's house and create a rift between Tarneja and Ahuja who will compromise on the contracts to be given to them from D'Mello. Vinod and Sudhir somehow successfully create a rift between the two by secretly informing Tarneja's assistant Ashok in the guise of Albert Pinto that Ahuja is actually Shobha's friend and wants to cheat Tarneja. The fight takes place until Tarneja's secretary Priya arrives with Assistant Municipal Commissioner Srivastav and tells them that D'Mello has given the contracts to neither Tarneja nor Ahuja but to someone else. 

While working on the story, Sudhir and Vinod decide to enter a photography contest that carries prize money of Rs. 5000/-, and take a number of photographs all over the city. On developing their pictures, in one of the photographs, they see a man shooting someone and after enlarging it, they realize that the killer is none other than Tarneja. They immediately return to the park where they shot that photo and eventually find out the crime scene. They find the body lying behind the bushes but before the duo can get to the body, it disappears, but they manage to retrieve one of a pair of gold cuff links. Sometime later, they attend the inauguration of a bridge dedicated to the memory of late D'Mello who is supposed to have died of a terminal disease. There they discover the other cuff link. They return at night and dig up the area and unearth a coffin containing the dead body of D'Mello.

They take several photographs of the corpse, and wheel it with them with the hopes of exposing Tarneja. However, the body disappears. They lie to Shobha saying that the body is hidden safely with them. Shobha, in turn, starts blackmailing Tarneja. He invites her, Vinod and Sudhir for dinner and plants a time bomb to kill them. Unfortunately, the bomb explodes after the three escape. They later find out from the news that the bridge built in the memory of D'Mello collapsed and the police are suspecting Vinod and Sudhir. The duo eventually find out about Shobha's blackmailing and after telling her the truth that the body is missing, the duo bid goodbye to Shobha after realizing that there's no difference between her and Tarneja.

Vinod and Sudhir find out that the body is with Ahuja who had, in an inebriated condition, carried the coffin to his farmhouse. They steal the corpse but not before Tarneja, Ahuja, Srivastav, Shobha and others also get involved resulting in a series of comic mix-ups.

The police arrive and Vinod and Sudhir present their evidence to the police officer. Srivastav tells the officer to wait a few minutes before arresting Tarneja. Tarneja tells Ahuja and Shobha that if he goes to jail, he would make sure that their malpractices are also exposed. In a twist ending, they all come to an agreement and Srivastav manages to pin the collapse of the bridge on Vinod and Sudhir. In the final scene, Vinod and Sudhir are shown several months/years later released from prison, still in their prison clothes. They turn to the camera and make a symbolic cut-throat gesture, signifying the death of justice and truth.

Cast 
 Naseeruddin Shah as Vinod Chopra
 Ravi Baswani as Sudhir Mishra
 Om Puri as Ahuja, a corrupt contractor
 Pankaj Kapur as Tarneja, a corrupt contractor who murders D'Mello
 Satish Shah as D'Mello, Municipal Commissioner
 Bhakti Barve as Shobha Sen, editor of the "Khabardar" magazine (voice dubbed by Anita Kanwar)
 Rajesh Puri as Kamdar, assistant editor of the "Khabardar" magazine
 Satish Kaushik as Ashok Namboodirippad, Tarneja's assistant
 Neena Gupta as Priya, Tarneja's secretary
 Deepak Qazir as Srivastav, Assistant Municipal Commissioner
 Zafar Sanjari
 Ashok Banthia as News correspondent
 Vidhu Vinod Chopra as theater actor playing Dushasana
 Anupam Kher as voiceover for Architect Tulyaani at construction site
 Ajay Wadhavkar as Police Constable under the bridge

Reception 
The film was not immediately successful at the box office when released, but was eventually regarded as a cult classic, which is reflected in a recent comment by Indian Express that the film's high recall value even after 37 years, is due to "it(s) superb satirical depiction of the essential, timeless, human condition: supreme self-interest versus some moral/ethical anchor. What made the depiction particularly powerful was its setting: India of the early '80s".

Re-release
A digitally restored print of the film was released on 2 November 2012 at selected theaters. The film opened to an enthusiastic welcome from the media and discerning filmgoers.

Awards 
31st National Film Awards:
 Indira Gandhi Award for Best Debut Film of a Director: Kundan Shah

 32nd Filmfare Awards:

Won

 Best Comedian – Ravi Baswani

Nominated

 Best Film – National Film Development Corporation of India
 Best Director – Kundan Shah
 Best Comedian – Satish Shah

Trivia 
 Blow-Up, a 1966 English-language film directed by Michelangelo Antonioni in which a photographer believes he may have witnessed a murder and unwittingly takes photographs of the killing, was an inspiration for Jaane Bhi Do Yaaro. The filmmakers paid homage to Blow-Up by naming the park in which the murder occurs "Antonioni Park".
 The names of the lead characters – Vinod Chopra and Sudhir Mishra – came from film directors Vidhu Vinod Chopra and Sudhir Mishra, who were assisting Kundan Shah in the movie. Sudhir Mishra co-wrote the script and assisted in directing the movie, while Vidhu Vinod Chopra was the production controller of the film.
 Vidhu Vinod Chopra played Dushasana in the Mahabharata play in the climax of the movie. He also played a photographer in the first half of the film, where a group of journalists interviews Tarneja, played by Pankaj Kapoor.

See also
 Assassinations in fiction

References

External links
 What makes a perfect comedy?
 
 

1983 films
1980s Hindi-language films
Indian black comedy films
Films about photojournalists
Indian satirical films
Films about corruption in India
Films set in Mumbai
Corruption in Maharashtra
Best Debut Feature Film of a Director National Film Award winners
Indian avant-garde and experimental films
1980s avant-garde and experimental films
Films shot in Mumbai
1983 directorial debut films
Films directed by Kundan Shah